Teesdale  is a small town in the Golden Plains Shire, near the regional city of Geelong and less than  west of the state capital, Melbourne.

The town has become a place for both high net worth residents seeking a country lifestyle, and young homebuyers who are prepared to commute to Melbourne or Geelong for work.

A feature of the town is a large park to the north of the main road known to the locals as 'Turtle Bend', featuring playgrounds, bike tracks, walking trails, BBQ areas, and a community building with a steel roof in the shape of a turtle.

Teesdale General Store and Post Office is one of the oldest in the area, having opened on 8 March 1864.

In addition to the general store and post office, Teesdale is a thriving small town community which includes a primary school, doctors clinic, pharmacy, cafe, childcare centre, community hall and numerous sporting and community organisations.

References

Towns in Victoria (Australia)
Golden Plains Shire